Brandon Lamar Jackson (born October 2, 1985) is a former American football running back. He was drafted by the Green Bay Packers in the second round of the 2007 NFL Draft. He later won Super Bowl XLV with the Packers against the Pittsburgh Steelers. He played college football at Nebraska.

Early years
Jackson was a two-time Class 5A state offensive player of the year at Horn Lake High School. He was also named to the Dandy Dozen by the Jackson Clarion-Ledger, signifying the top 12 players in the state of Mississippi.

In 2003, Jackson was a significant driving force taking his team from a 0-5 losing streak to the Mississippi State Playoffs, losing their first round and going out at 5–6.

Track and field
Aside from football Jackson was also a track star with, he lettered four times in track, and had a career best of 10.6 seconds in the 100 meters. He was sixth at state in the 100 as a senior, and helped the 4x200-meter relay squad finish third at state in 2004, while aiding the 4x100 relay squad's fourth-place state finish. He was also part of the 4x400-meter relay team that was second at the Class 5A state meet in 2003.

In the University of Nebraska, he competed in the 60 meters and 200 meters, recording personal bests of 6.86 seconds and 21.75 seconds, respectively.

College career
Jackson played college football at Nebraska. During his career at Nebraska he started 11 of 33 games, rushing for 1,431 yards on 291 carries and 14 touchdowns.

Professional career

2007 NFL Combine

Green Bay Packers
Jackson was drafted by the Green Bay Packers in the second round of the 2007 NFL Draft. He scored his first NFL touchdown in Week 3, on September 23, 2007 against the San Diego Chargers. Jackson topped the 100 yard mark for the first time in his career on December 30, 2007. On January 2, 2008 Jackson was voted NFL Rookie of the Week for his performance against the Detroit Lions in which he ran the ball 20 times for 113 yards and made two receptions for 22 yards in the Packers 34–13 victory. In the 11 games he played in, Jackson rushed for 267 yards on 75 carries and a touchdown and added 130 yards on 16 receptions.

Jackson played in 13 games during his 2008 season, rushing for 248 yards on 45 carries and a touchdown, with 30 receptions for 185 yards. In 2009, Jackson ran for 111 yards in 12 games on 37 attempts, with two rushing touchdowns and a receiving touchdown.

When starter Ryan Grant suffered ligament damage to his ankle during the first game of the 2010 season, Jackson was named the starter. During the regular season, Jackson achieved new career highs with 703 yards rushing and 342 yards receiving. However, Jackson would later lose his starting job to rookie RB James Starks.

At the end of the 2010 season, Jackson and the Packers appeared in Super Bowl XLV against the Pittsburgh Steelers. He had one reception for 14 yards in the game.

Cleveland Browns
Jackson was signed by the Cleveland Browns on July 29, 2011. He suffered a toe injury in the preseason, and was placed on the injured reserve list in September. On May 16, 2013, he signed a one-year contract to stay with the Cleveland Browns.

References

External links

Green Bay Packers bio
Nebraska Cornhuskers bio

1985 births
Living people
People from DeSoto County, Mississippi
Players of American football from Detroit
Players of American football from Mississippi
African-American players of American football
American football running backs
Nebraska Cornhuskers football players
Green Bay Packers players
Cleveland Browns players
21st-century African-American sportspeople
20th-century African-American people